Miss America 1947, the 21st Miss America pageant, was held at the Boardwalk Hall in Atlantic City, New Jersey on September 6, 1947. Barbara Jo Walker was the last Miss America to be crowned in her swimsuit, as well as the last contestant to represent just a city, rather than her state. Margaret Marshall, representing Canada, captured the swimsuit competition and placed third overall in the pageant. The judges for the Miss America pagenat were Win Barron (Paramount's representative in Canada), Vincent Trotta (head of National Screen Service art department), Walter Thornton (head of the Walter Thornton Model Agency), and Arthur William Brown (noted illustrator).

Results

Awards

Preliminary awards

Other awards

Contestants

References

Secondary sources

External links
 Miss America official website

1947
1947 in the United States
1947 in New Jersey
September 1947 events in the United States
Events in Atlantic City, New Jersey